The following is a list of squads for each national team competing at the 2019 Africa U-23 Cup of Nations. The tournament took place in Egypt, between 8–22 November 2019. It was the third U-23 age group competition organised by the Confederation of African Football (CAF).

The 8 national teams involved in the tournament were required to register a squad of 21 players, including three goalkeepers. Only players in these squads were eligible to take part in the tournament. Players born on or after 1 January 1997 were eligible to compete in the tournament. On 5 November 2019, CAF published the final lists with squad numbers on their website.

The full squad listings are below. The position listed for each player is per the official squad list published by CAF. The age listed for each player is on 8 November 2019, the first day of the tournament. The nationality for each club reflects the national association (not the league) to which the club is affiliated. A flag is included for coaches who are of a different nationality than their own national team.

Players marked in boldface have been capped at full international level.

Group A

Egypt 
Coach: Shawky Gharieb

The preliminary squad was announced on 23 October 2019. The final squad was announced on 29 October 2019.

Mali 
Coach: Fanyeri Diarra

The final squad was announced on 26 October 2019.

Cameroon 
Coach: Rigobert Song

The preliminary squad was announced on 2 October 2019. The final squad was announced on 29 October 2019.

Ghana 
Coach: Ibrahim Tanko

The preliminary squad was announced on 9 October 2019. The final squad was announced on 1 November 2019.

Group B

Nigeria 
Coach: Imama Amapakabo

The final squad was announced on 31 October 2019.

Ivory Coast 
Coach: Soualiho Haïdara

The final squad was announced on 30 October 2019.

South Africa 
Coach: David Notoane

The final squad was announced on 1 November 2019.

Zambia 
Coach: Beston Chambeshi

The preliminary squad was announced on 5 October 2019. The squad was then trimmed-down on 21 October 2019. The final squad was announced on 29 October 2019.

References

Africa U-23 Cup of Nations